The Dallas Post Tribune is a weekly newspaper published every Thursday.  It is distributed throughout the Dallas–Fort Worth area of the U.S. state of Texas. The Dallas Post Tribune was originally created in 1947 in Tyler, Texas by Bert C. Muse. Before it became the Dallas Post Tribune the paper went through a few different name changes, the first being the Tyler Morning Tribune, followed by The Dallas Star Post, before renaming the company to the Dallas Post Tribune. According to the print media experts Echo Media, the Dallas Post Tribune currently holds the title of being the largest black-owned newspaper in the northern Texas area.

Fred J. Finch Jr., a Dallas attorney affiliated with the Post Tribune in the 1980s, went on to found The Dallas Examiner, with a focus on a racially diverse audience, quality journalism and savvy business management. Finch retained an ownership stake in the Post Tribune. According to Willie Mae Hughey, business manager for the Examiner in the 1990s, during that time the Post Tribune contained "standard fare for a black weekly: church news, sorority-fraternity announcement, "man-on-street" reactions, and notable achievements by local residents, scattered among brief news reports and myriad columns featuring commentary on civil rights issues."

References

Newspapers published in the Dallas–Fort Worth metroplex
African-American newspapers
Weekly newspaper companies of the United States
Publications established in 1947
1947 establishments in Texas
Weekly newspapers published in Texas